Heavyweight boxers Muhammad Ali and Jürgen Blin fought on December 26, 1971 in Zürich, Switzerland. Ali won the bout through a knockout in the seventh round.

References

Blin
1971 in boxing
December 1971 sports events in Europe